The Bank of England Act 1708 (7 Ann c 30) was an Act of the Parliament of Great Britain. It was one of the Bank of England Acts 1694 to 1892.

This Act is chapter 7 in Ruffhead's Edition and the old editions and chapter VII in common printed editions.

Sections 66 to 68 are sections 61 to 63 in Ruffhead's Edition.

The Bank of England Act 1708, except sections 1 to 5, 60, 61, 66 to 68, 70, 75 and 77, was repealed by section 1 of, and the Schedule to, the Statute Law Revision Act 1867.

Title
The title, from "and for raising" to the end of the title, was repealed by section 1 of, and the Schedule to, the Statute Law Revision Act 1887.

Preamble
The preamble was repealed by section 8(3) of, and Part I of the Schedule to, the Bank Act 1892.

Section 1
This section was repealed by section 8(3) of, and Part I of the Schedule to, the Bank Act 1892.

Section 2
This section was repealed by section 8(3) of, and Part I of the Schedule to, the Bank Act 1892.

Section 3
This section was repealed by section 8(3) of, and Part I of the Schedule to, the Bank Act 1892.

Section 4
This section was repealed by section 8(3) of, and Part I of the Schedule to, the Bank Act 1892.

Section 5
This section is section 2 in Ruffhead's Edition. This section was repealed by section 8(3) of, and Part I of the Schedule to, the Bank Act 1892.

Section 60
This section is not printed in Ruffhead's Edition. This section was repealed by section 3(4) of, and Schedule 3 to, the Bank of England Act 1946.

Section 61
This section was repealed by section 3(4) of, and Schedule 3 to, the Bank of England Act 1946.

Section 66
This section was repealed by section 1 of, and Schedule 1 to, the Statute Law Revision Act 1948.

Section 67
This section down to "persons, and that" and from "and the said allowances" down to "governor  and company" and from "allowances and" down to "governor and company as aforesaid" was repealed by section 8(3) of, and Part I of the Schedule to, the Bank Act 1892. This section was repealed by section 1 of, and Schedule 1 to, the Statute Law Revision Act 1948.

Section 68
This section was repealed by section 8(3) of, and Part I of the Schedule to, the Bank Act 1892.

Section 70
This section is section 65 in Ruffhead's Edition. This section was repealed by section 3(4) of, and Schedule 3 to, the Bank of England Act 1946.

Section 75
This section is section 70 in Ruffhead's Edition. This section was repealed by section 1 of, and the Schedule to, the Statute Law Revision Act 1887.

Section 77
This section is section 72 in Ruffhead's Edition. This section was repealed by section 3(4) of, and Schedule 3 to, the Bank of England Act 1946.

References

Halsbury's Statutes,

Great Britain Acts of Parliament 1708
Bank of England
Repealed Great Britain Acts of Parliament
Banking legislation in the United Kingdom
1708 in economics
Banking in Great Britain